Spirits of the Air, Gremlins of the Clouds is a 1989 Australian independent post-apocalyptic sci-fi adventure film directed, produced and written by Alex Proyas, which was marking its first feature debut. Set in a post-apocalyptic world in which two siblings live in a homestead whose silence gets interrupted by a fugitive named Smith. Starring Michael Lake, Rhys Davis and Norman Boyd, the film was shot on location near Broken Hill, New South Wales and at Supreme Studios Sydney and was made with a budget of $500,000.

Upon release, the film received mixed reviews. It is unknown how much the film grossed at the box office yet it commenced Proyas' status in filmmaking.

Premise
Siblings Felix and Betty Crabtree live alone in a homestead on a treeless desert plain. Their solitary lives are interrupted by a fugitive with a mysterious past, who gives the name "Smith". Smith is fleeing to the north, a trio of sinister figures in pursuit. Felix, who is a wheelchair user, tells Smith that the route to the north is blocked by an impassable wall of cliffs, and convinces him that the only way he can travel beyond them is to fly. Smith, at first sceptical, is eventually convinced that his only means of escape lies with Felix's plan to build a "flying machine". Meanwhile, the religiously addled Betty is convinced that Smith is a demon from hell, and makes her own plans to get rid of him.

Cast
 Michael Lake as Felix Crabtree
 Rhys Davis (Melissa Davis) as Betty Crabtree
 Norman Boyd (The Norm) as Smith

Reception
Film critic David Stratton praised the film as having a "special vision," with brilliant production design, but while furthermore opined that "the film frustrates because of its lethargy and stiltedness".

Rolling Stone magazine called the soundtrack recording "an album of stunning instrumental beauty and exquisite soundscapes" and awarded it 4 stars.

Re-release
In June 2018, director Alex Proyas released a trailer on his YouTube channel for a re-release of the movie, remastered from original 16mm negative and featuring a restored soundtrack from the original Dolby Stereo mixes. The movie was re-released internationally in September 2018 on Blu-ray and DVD by Umbrella Entertainment. Composer Peter Miller's original soundtrack was also re-released as a 30th anniversary edition.

Accolades

References

External links
 
 
Spirits of the Air, Gremlins of the Clouds at Oz Movies
Spirits Image & Trivia Archive Archive of selected behind-the-scenes and production images, and other information.

1980s science fiction adventure films
1989 films
Australian aviation films
Australian science fiction adventure films
Films directed by Alex Proyas
Films produced by Alex Proyas
Films with screenplays by Alex Proyas
Australian post-apocalyptic films
1989 directorial debut films
1980s English-language films